Cnodontes is a genus of butterflies in the family Lycaenidae. The species of this genus are endemic to the Afrotropical realm.

Species
Cnodontes bouyeri Kielland, 1994
Cnodontes pallida (Trimen, 1898)
Cnodontes penningtoni Bennett, 1954
Cnodontes vansomereni Stempffer & Bennett, 1953

External links
Cnodontes at Markku Savela's Lepidoptera and some other life forms
Royal Museum of Central Africa Images

Poritiinae
Lycaenidae genera